Behind the eight ball (in various spellings) may refer to:

"Behind the eight ball", an idiomatic expression meaning in a difficult situation
Behind the Eight Ball, a 1942–1956 series of short comedy films with Joe McDoakes
"Behind the Eight Ball", a 1942 song in You Don't Know What Love Is, a musical from Universal Pictures
Behind the Eight Ball (film), a 1942 American comedy film
"Behind the Eight Ball", a 1947 song by Johnny Tyler
Behind the 8 Ball, a 1964 album by US organist Baby Face Willette
"Behind the Eight Ball", a 1991 episode of the television comedy series Top of the Heap
Behind the 8 ball, a 2004 album by Australian musician 8 Ball Aitken

See also
Eight-ball (disambiguation)